Eysines is a commune in the Gironde department in southwestern France.

Population

Notable people linked to the commune 
 Julien Courbet, born 7 February 1965, French journalist, television presenter and producer 
 Jean-Claude Lalumière, novelist
 Lucenzo, French-Portuguese singer and record producer
 Pierre Duret de la Plane (1728-1811), agronomist and benefactor

See also
Communes of the Gironde department

References

Communes of Gironde